George Robert Adams (born 28 September 1947 in Shoreditch) is an English former professional footballer who played in the Football League as a midfielder.

References
 . Retrieved 28 October 2013.

1947 births
Living people
Footballers from Shoreditch
English footballers
Association football midfielders
Chelsea F.C. players
Peterborough United F.C. players
English Football League players